Cristian Popescu may refer to:

 Cristian Popescu (poet) (1959–1995), Romanian poet
 Cristian Popescu Piedone (born 1963), Romanian politician
 Cristian Tudor Popescu (born 1956), Romanian journalist
 Cristian Dumitru Popescu, Romanian-American mathematician
 Eugen-Cristian Popescu (born 1962), retired Romanian high jumper

See also 
 Popescu